Çetmi can refer to:

 Çetmi
 Çetmi, Ezine
 Çetmi, İskilip
 Çetmi, Kargı